Bishalgarh is one of the 60 Legislative Assembly constituencies of Tripura state in India. It is in Sipahijala district and is a part of West Tripura Lok Sabha constituency.

Members of Legislative Assembly
 1967: U . L . Singh, Indian National Congress
 1972: Samir Ranjan Barman, Indian National Congress
 1977: Gautam Prasad Dutta, Communist Party of India (Marxist)
 1983: Bhanu Lal Saha, Communist Party of India (Marxist)
 1988: Samir Ranjan Barman, Indian National Congress
 1993: Samir Ranjan Barman, Indian National Congress
 1998: Samir Ranjan Barman, Indian National Congress
 2003: Samir Ranjan Barman, Indian National Congress
 2008: Bhanu Lal Saha, Communist Party of India (Marxist)
 2013: Bhanu Lal Saha, Communist Party of India (Marxist)

Election results

2018

2013

See also
List of constituencies of the Tripura Legislative Assembly
 Sipahijala district
 Bishalgarh
 Tripura West (Lok Sabha constituency)

References

Sipahijala district
Assembly constituencies of Tripura